The ERDL pattern, also known as the Leaf pattern, is a camouflage pattern developed by the United States Army at its Engineer Research & Development Laboratories (ERDL) in 1948. It was not used until the Vietnam War, when it was issued to elite reconnaissance and special operations units beginning early 1967.

The pattern consists of four colors printed in an interlocking pattern. It was initially produced in a green-dominant colorway, consisting of large organic shapes in olive green and brown, black ‘branches’, and light green ‘leaf highlights’. Shortly thereafter a brown-dominant scheme (with the light green replaced by light tan) was manufactured. The two patterns are also unofficially known as "Lowland" and "Highland" ERDL, respectively.

History

The United States Marine Corps (USMC) adopted the green "Lowland" version as standard issue in South Vietnam from 1968, and later the U.S. Army introduced it on a wide scale in Southeast Asia.

The ERDL-pattern combat uniform was identical in cut to the OG-107 Tropical Combat uniform, commonly called "jungle fatigues", it was issued alongside. It was common for marines to wear mixes of ERDL and OG-107 jungle fatigues, which was authorized owing to periodic shortages. Australian and New Zealand SAS members were also issued U.S.-spec tropical combat uniforms in ERDL during their time in the Vietnam War. By the end of the Vietnam War, U.S. servicemen wore camouflage combat dress as the norm.

Following the withdrawal of the U.S. military from South Vietnam in 1973, the U.S. Army no longer routinely issued camouflage clothing. The 1st Battalion, 13th Infantry Regiment wore the ERDL-leaf pattern as an experiment in the early 1970s from January 1973 to 1974 in Baumholder, Germany. Soldiers in the 1st and 2d Ranger Battalions (1/75 & 2/75 Ranger [Airborne]) received ERDL jungle fatigues of all three varieties as organizational issue, and during this same period U.S. Army Special Forces Groups, the U.S. Army John F. Kennedy Special Warfare Center and School, the 82d Airborne Division and 36th Airborne Brigade (Texas National Guard) were issued the ERDL jungle fatigues until replaced by BDUs. 1st Battalion (mechanized), 41st Infantry, wore ERDL uniforms in 1974 and 1975. In 1976, the Marines obtained the leftover Vietnam War-era ERDL pattern uniforms which became general issue, replacing the solid OG-107 sateen utility/fatigue uniform. As there was never an ERDL pattern Marine-style utility cap, the Marines continued to wear the solid OG utility hat until the adoption of the BDU pattern. The Army had a similar problem— while most units issued ERDL pattern uniforms wore a beret in garrison, the M1951 field cap or patrol cap worn in the field by Ranger and Special Forces units was a solid OG. However there was a ERDL pattern boonie hat. The uniform was to be used to equip the United States Rapid Deployment Force (RDF) while on tropical missions. Photographs during the 1979 Iranian hostage crisis show U.S. marines guarding the U.S. embassy wearing the RDF version ERDL uniforms when they were taken hostage by Iranian revolutionaries.

It was not until 1981 that the Army approved another camouflaged uniform. That year it officially introduced the M81 Battle Dress Uniform (BDU) in Woodland pattern, an enlarged and slightly altered version of ERDL, to supply all arms of the U.S. military. Marine Corps Order P1020-34D, published in 1983, labels the ERDL pattern as the poplin camouflage pattern and the new BDU camouflage as woodland camouflage pattern. P1020-34D also specifies that the poplin camouflage uniform was authorized for wear until a replacement was required. Despite the process of being phase-out in the 1980s, the pattern continued to see service up into the 1990s. The camouflage pattern is referenced once again as poplin camouflage pattern in Marine Corps Order P1020-34F in 1995 and was labeled as authorized for wear. ERDL was notably seen being worn by various US troops during the Invasion of Panama and seen in 1996 during US Peacekeeping operations in Africa.

Garment types, designs, and use in Southeast Asia (1967–72)
The ERDL pattern was used on official and unofficial U.S. military garments in Southeast Asia (SEA), in both ground and aviation garment versions, from 1967 to the war's end. Early production on the ERDL ran into problems due to roller slippage, which results in inconsistencies with the patterns that were printed.

On official ground combat garments, the ERDL pattern was first applied to the third model Tropical Combat Uniform around 1967, and was printed onto a lightweight cotton poplin textile material. This poplin uniform was very short-lived, but it did see combat use in SEA by various U.S. special operations and some other units. Soon afterward, the ERDL pattern was printed onto the standard rip-stop cotton textile material. This ERDL rip-stop cotton Tropical Combat Uniform version thus saw wide use in SEA after 1968, with special operations units and also regular units, especially as ground combat operations continued throughout the war up to late 1972.

On official aviation combat garments, the ERDL pattern was used on the USAF Type K-2B flying coveralls, in a cotton poplin textile version. The USAF ERDL coveralls saw some use in SEA from 1967–69, until replaced by Nomex coveralls in 1970. The U.S. Navy also produced an official ERDL aviation garment in their MIL-C-5390G pattern, produced in a cotton twill textile. These Navy ERDL coveralls saw very limited SEA use from 1967–68, as their Nomex coveralls were already in use.

On unofficial and commercial garments, the ERDL pattern was copied and used by U.S. commercial textile manufacturers in the late 1960s, and applied to various commercial camouflage garments for hunting or unofficial military use. Some commercial ERDL garment examples were made using cotton poplin material, and others were made in the standard rip-stop cotton material. Many commercial ERDL garment examples of the time were made in the pattern mirroring the standard OG-107 fatigue uniforms, with a standard tucked-in shirt, and conventional trousers design. These commercial ERDL OG-107 fatigue-style garments did see some combat use in SEA, such as with U.S. Navy tactical jet aviators in the 1968 timeframe. Some USAF aviators also purchased locally tailor-made ERDL garments for combat and off-duty use. Additionally, some tropical combat uniforms were made by local tailors in the ERDL rip-stop material, which were particularly useful when a classified mission required the use of 'sanitized' or 'sterile' apparel, and equipment.

Users

Current
 : The Czech Armed Forces use a modified version of the ERDL pattern, known as Woodland pattern vz.95.
 : Seen in 2012 with North Korean military units.
 : Clones made for the Syrian military.

Former
 : Formerly used by Australian SAS in the Vietnam War.
 : Formerly used by the Special Action Force in the 1980s. Also used by the Home Front Defense Group and the Scout Ranger Regiment.
 : Formerly used by New Zealand SAS during (and after) the Vietnam War
 : Formerly used by the Singaporean military.
 : Formerly used by the South Vietnamese army, consisting of regular and "invisible" ERDL-type camo.
 : Formerly used by Taiwanese military.
 : Formerly used by the Thai military.
 : Formerly used by Turkish Armed Forces in late 1980s early 1990s.
 : Some used by Hunter Group and 32 Battalion commandos.
 : Formerly used by the U.S. military until it was phased out in the late-1990s.
 : Clones of South Vietnamese ERDL patterns were formerly used by the PAVN.

Non-State Actors
 Karen National Liberation Army
 Khmer People's National Liberation Front: Used Thai-made ERDL camos in the 1980s.

References

Further reading

External links

1948 clothing
United States military uniforms
Camouflage patterns
Military equipment of the United States
United States Army uniforms
Military equipment introduced from 1945 to 1949